United States v. Harriss, 347 U.S. 612 (1954), was a U.S. Supreme Court case applied directly to the Regulation of Lobbying Act.

Proceedings and outcome
Lobbyists challenged the Regulation of Lobbying Act for being unconstitutionally vague and unclear. In Harriss, the Supreme Court responded by upholding the act's constitutionality, but also by narrowing the scope and application of the act. The Court ruled that the act applies only to paid lobbyists who directly communicate with members of Congress on pending or proposed federal legislation. This means that lobbyists who visit with congressional staff members rather than members of Congress themselves are not considered lobbyists. In addition, the act covers only attempts to influence the passage or defeat of legislation in Congress, and excludes other congressional activities. Further, the act applies to and restricts only individuals who spend at least half of their time lobbying.

See also
List of United States Supreme Court cases, volume 347

Notes

External links
 
 

United States Supreme Court cases
United States Supreme Court cases of the Warren Court
Lobbying in the United States
1954 in United States case law